Karakoin is a salt lake in Ulytau District, Ulytau Region, Kazakhstan.

It is the largest lake in the district. The area around Karakoin is largely uninhabited. The lake basin is a seasonal grazing ground for local cattle.

Geography
Karakoin is an endorheic lake in the Sarysu basin. It is located in an arid zone at the northern edge of the Betpak-Dala. The western lakeshore is nearly straight and rises abruptly from the lake surface, while the eastern is low, marshy and  deeply indented. There are some small islands close to the eastern lakeshore. 

Usually it almost dries completely in the summer. The bottom of the lake is flat and muddy. The mud is reputed to have medicinal properties.

See also
Kazakh semi-desert
List of lakes of Kazakhstan

References

External links

Lakes of Kazakhstan
Ulytau Region